Bart Stevens and Tim van Rijthoven were the defending champions but only Stevens chose to defend his title, partnering Luke Johnson. Stevens lost in the first round to Gabriel Debru and Benoît Paire.

Jonathan Eysseric and David Pel won the title after defeating Dan Added and Albano Olivetti 6–4, 6–4 in the final.

Seeds

Draw

References

External links
 Main draw

Open de Rennes - Doubles
2022 Doubles